Candida ubatubensis is a yeast species. Its type strain is UNESP 01-247RT (=CBS 10003T =NRRL Y-27812T).

References

Further reading

ubatubensis
Yeasts
Fungi described in 1999